Porowski (feminine Porowska) is a Polish surname. Notable people include:
 Antoni Porowski (born 1984), Canadian actor
  (born 1968), Polish politician 
 Sylwester Porowski (born 1938), Polish physicist

Polish-language surnames